Philip Sowers House is a historic home located near Churchland, Davidson County, North Carolina. It was built between about 1861 and 1870, and is a large two-story, vernacular Greek Revival style brick dwelling.  The -story rear wing is of log construction and dates to the early-19th century.  It has a "Y"-shaped triple wing design with the rooms arranged around a hexagonal stair hall with a graceful half-spiral staircase.  Also on the property are a contributing corn crib and log barn.

It was added to the National Register of Historic Places in 1980.

References

Houses on the National Register of Historic Places in North Carolina
Greek Revival houses in North Carolina
Houses completed in 1870
Houses in Davidson County, North Carolina
National Register of Historic Places in Davidson County, North Carolina